Siemens Ltd., Saudi Arabia is a joint venture between Siemens AG and E. A. Juffali and Brothers. Siemens Ltd. trades in many fields, including smart infrastructure, digital industries and large drive applications. Also operating in the Kingdom of Saudi Arabia under the Siemens brand are Siemens Healthineers, Siemens Mobility, and Siemens Energy, all of which are separately managed companies.

History 
Siemens’ presence in the region started in the mid-1800s when the founder, Werner von Siemens, personally led a team to lay telegraphic cables under the Red Sea. 

In 1929 Siemens & Halske (S&H) won its first contract in Jeddah in the Hijaz region of Western Saudi Arabia. By 1938, Siemens exported its first shipment to Saudi Arabia.

In 1956, the construction of a wide area radio network was inaugurated by King Saud. To support this project, a Siemens resident engineer was delegated to Saudi Arabia in 1957.

In 1968, the construction of Saudi Arabia's first 110 kV high-voltage network began in Jeddah. Three years later, in 1971, Siemens built a sea-water desalination plant.

In 2004, Saudi Arabian women were employed by Siemens for the first time. 

In 2013, Siemens was awarded contracts for the Riyadh Metro Project, the largest public transit project currently under way. In 2014, Siemens introduced the Mechatronics curriculum to Saudi Arabia to enhance student learning in preparation for the future of industry. In 2016, Siemens started an education and research collaboration with the MiSK Foundation and Effat University, the Kingdom's first private institution of higher learning for women.

In addition to low and medium-voltage panels, the K14 factory also assembles mobile and customized substations for the National Grid.

See also
List of companies of Saudi Arabia

References

Companies of Saudi Arabia
Companies based in Riyadh
Siemens